The North Korean judicial system is based on the Soviet model. It includes the Central Court of the Democratic People's Republic of Korea, Provincial and special-city level Courts, local People's Courts, and Special Courts.

The Central Court is the highest court, with its judges appointed by the Supreme People's Assembly (SPA). According to the Constitution of North Korea, the Central Court is accountable to the SPA, and the Criminal Code subjects judges to criminal liability for handing down "unjust sentences".

Supreme Court

The Central Court is the highest court and court of appeal in North Korea.

The court is headed by a Chief Judge(판사) or President(소장), two Associate Chief Judges/Vice Presidents and unknown number of regular Justices.

The court's home was completed in 2010

Former Chief Judges and Associate Judges

 Pang Hak Se 1972–1992; Chief Judge
 Kim Pyong Ryul 1998–2012; died 2013
 Choe Yong-song - Associate Judge
 Hyon Hong-sam - Associate Judge

Lower Courts of North Korea

Below the high court are two other judicial levels:

 Provincial Court or Court of the Province - 9 courts
 People's Courts or Court of the County

Judicial independence 

Article 157 of the Constitution states that "cases are heard in public, and the accused is guaranteed the right to a defense; hearings may be closed to the public as stipulated by law". The lack of judicial independence is also evidenced by Article 11 of the Prosecution Supervisory Law that stipulates "The prosecutor(s) shall supervise whether the trial or arbitration of a case is accurately deliberating and resolving the legal requirements and in a timely manner."

Organization 
The Constitution states that justice is administered by the Central Court, Provincial or special-city level courts, the People's Court or Special Courts, and the courts are accountable to the Supreme People's Assembly (SPA) or when it is not in session, its Presidium.

See also

 Law enforcement in North Korea
 Law of North Korea
 Judiciary of South Korea

References

Further reading

 
Politics of North Korea
Law of North Korea